Carlo Rambaldi (September 15, 1925 – August 10, 2012) was an Italian special effects artist, winner of three Oscars: one Special Achievement Academy Award for Best Visual Effects in 1977 for the 1976 version of King Kong and two Academy Awards for Best Visual Effects in 1980 and 1983 for, respectively, Alien (1979) and E.T. the Extra-Terrestrial (1982). He is most famous for his work in those two last mentioned films, that is for the mechanical head-effects for the creature in Alien and the design of the title character of E.T. the Extra-Terrestrial.

Early life
Carlo Rambaldi was born September 15, 1925 in Vigarano Mainarda, Emilia-Romagna. He studied painting at the Accademia di Belle Arti di Bologna, where he developed a passion for electromechanics and the skeleton and musculature of the human body. He was heavily influenced by the work of Picasso and the Italian artist Renato Guttuso.

Career
Rambaldi's first work in film was creating a fire-breathing dragon for the 1957 Italian picture Sigfrido (titled in the English version as The Dragon's Blood).

In 1963 he became a full-time special effects artist. He worked with Italian directors including Mario Bava, Federico Fellini, Pier Paolo Pasolini, Mario Monicelli and Dario Argento. Some films he worked on included Medusa vs the Son of Hercules (1962), Bloody Pit of Horror (1965), Planet of the Vampires (1965), Hercules and the Princess of Troy (1965), L'Odissea (1968, a TV miniseries), A Bay of Blood (1972), The Night of the Devils (1972), Andy Warhol's Frankenstein (1974), Andy Warhol's Dracula (1974), Deep Red (Profondo Rosso, 1975), King Kong (1976), Close Encounters of the Third Kind (1977), Alien (1979), Nightwing (1979), Possession (1981), E.T. the Extra-Terrestrial (1982), Dune (1984), Conan the Destroyer (1984), Silver Bullet (1985), Cat's Eye (1985), King Kong Lives (1986) and Cameron's Closet (1988), among others.

Rambaldi had the distinction of being the first special effects artist to be required to prove that his work on a film was not 'real'. Dog-mutilation scenes in the 1971 film A Lizard in a Woman's Skin were so convincingly visceral that its director, Lucio Fulci, was prosecuted for offenses relating to animal cruelty. Fulci would have served a two-year prison sentence, had Rambaldi not exhibited the film's array of props to a courtroom, proving that the scene was not filmed using real animals.

Rambaldi's last screen credit was on the 1988 horror film Primal Rage, directed by his son Vittorio. When computer-generated special effects became common place, Rambaldi complained, "Any kid with a computer can reproduce the special effects seen in today’s movies. The mystery's gone. The curiosity that viewers once felt when they saw special effects has disappeared. It's as if a magician had revealed all of his tricks... There’s no question that these computer films are well packaged but the charm has disappeared... If Spielberg were to film E.T. today using the latest technology I'm not sure it would be a hit because the techniques they’re using at the moment couldn't reproduce the tender expression of ET's eyes, for example. The secret of creating what technology is unable to express lies in the work of the artisan, who is able to develop characteristics that touch our deepest emotions."

Personal life and death
Carlo Rambaldi married Bruna Basso, with whom he had a son, Vittorio, and a daughter, Daniela. Another son, Alessandro, died of a rare form of leukemia at 33 years of age.

Rambaldi died after a long illness on August 10, 2012 in Lamezia Terme, Calabria, where he had lived for the last decade of his life, after relocating to be near his daughter and grandchildren.

His ashes were laid to rest in the family tomb in Vigarano Mainarda, near his son Alessandro.

Select filmography

Academy Awards

One Special Achievement Academy Award
 1977 (49th): for Best Visual Effects for King Kong (1976), shared with Glen Robinson and Frank Van der Veer

Two Academy Awards for Best Visual Effects
 1980 (52nd): for Best Visual Effects for Alien (1979), shared with H. R. Giger, Brian Johnson, Nick Allder, and Dennis Ayling
 1983 (55th): for Best Visual Effects for E.T. the Extra-Terrestrial (1982), shared with Dennis Muren and Kenneth F. Smith

Other awards

Los Angeles Film Critics Association Awards
 1982: Special Award, "for the body of his work"

Saturn Awards
 1983: for Best Special Effects for E.T. the Extra-Terrestrial (1982), shared with Dennis Muren

MystFest Awards
 1985: Special Award, "for his whole activities"

Los Angeles Italian Film Awards
 2000: Outstanding Achievement Award for Best Special Effects

David di Donatello Awards
 2002: Special David Award

Notes

References

Footnotes

Sources

External links

Special effects people
1925 births
2012 deaths
People from the Province of Ferrara
People from Lamezia Terme
David di Donatello Career Award winners
Special Achievement Academy Award winners
Best Visual Effects Academy Award winners
Accademia di Belle Arti di Bologna alumni